The Calling is a 2000 straight-to-video horror film directed by Richard Caesar. The film stars Laura Harris, Richard Lintern, Francis Magee, Alex Roe, and Alice Krige.

Plot
Following in the same vein as such classics as Rosemary's Baby and The Omen, The Calling is the story of Kristie St. Clair, the involuntary mother of the Antichrist, and possibly the only person who can stop the coming of a modern-day apocalypse.

At first Kristie (Harris) believes that she has the perfect life: Marc (Lintern), her charming TV personality husband; Dylan (Alex Roe), her beautiful young son; an enchanting house in the British countryside; a successful new career... But as time goes by she begins to suspect something's not right with her family.

First, there's Dylan's increasingly violent behavior, which includes the impaling of his pet guinea pig on a stake and his apathy towards the death of a friend. Kristie cannot understand how her son, who she had focused so much energy and love on since he was born, could have turned out so heartless. Then there's the fact that Elizabeth (Krige), an old family friend, seems to be trying her hardest to replace Kristie and keep her away from Marc and Dylan as often as possible. Marc himself begins acting strangely, overreacting after a dog bite and hanging the dog in the backyard as punishment.

It becomes apparent to Kristie that something is very, very wrong, and that she is out of the loop. As her family withdraws further and further from her and she loses her best friend, Kristie turns to a mysterious taxi driver who seems to know a whole lot about everything. All Kristie wants is to save her son, even if it turns out that it is the Devil himself who is standing in her way.

With the help of the taxi driver, Kristie makes some shocking discoveries about her loved ones and comes to the conclusion that unless she stops him, Dylan will lead mankind into a horrifically malevolent future.

At the end, Kristie, who has now stopped caring for Dylan, escapes the hospital with Father Mullin and tells him it was a new time.  Father Mullin rips off his white collar tab and throws it out the window as they drive away.

Cast

Laura Harris as Kristie St.Clair 
Richard Lintern as Marc St.Clair
Francis Magee as Carmac 
Alex Roe as Dylan St.Clair
Alice Krige as Elizabeth Plummer
John Standing as Jack Plummer
Peter Waddington as Father Mullin
Nick Brimble as Police Inspector Oliver Morton
Rachel Shelley as Shelly
Camilla Power as Lynette
Deborah Baxter as Receptionist
Jack MacKenzie as Norman 
Roger Brierley as Reverend

Film locations
The majority of filming was in Cornwall, England, UK and London, England, UK.

References

External links

2000 direct-to-video films
2000 films
American supernatural horror films
Direct-to-video horror films
2000s English-language films
2000 horror films
Religious horror films
Films about religion
Films set in England
Films scored by Christopher Franke
German supernatural horror films
2000s American films
2000s German films